In mathematics, a pantachy or pantachie (from the Greek word πανταχη meaning everywhere) is a maximal totally ordered subset of a partially ordered set, especially a set of equivalence classes of sequences of real numbers.

Notes

References

 English translation in 

Order theory
Set theory